Judges who have served on the Supreme Court of Western Australia, include:
 Chief Justice of Western Australia
 Presidents of the Court of Appeal
 Judges of Appeal
 Judges
 Acting judges 
 Masters

Notes

References

 
Western Australia
Judges